Walter Peterson may refer to:

 Walter R. Peterson Jr. (1922–2011), American realtor, educator, and Republican politician from New Hampshire 
 Walter Peterson (field hockey) (born 1883), Irish field hockey player